Julie Doucet (born December 31, 1965) is a Canadian underground cartoonist and artist, best known for her autobiographical works such as Dirty Plotte and My New York Diary. Her work is concerned with such topics as "sex, violence, menstruation and male/female issues."

Biography

Early career
Doucet was born in Montreal, Quebec.  She was educated first at an all-girls Catholic school, then studied fine arts at Cégep du Vieux Montréal (a junior college) and afterward at the Université du Québec à Montréal. Her university degree was in printing arts.  She began cartooning in 1987. She was published in small-press comics and self-published her own comic called Dirty Plotte. She used the photocopied zine to record "her day to day life, her dreams, angsts, [and] fantasies."  It was only when she was published in Weirdo, Robert Crumb's magazine, that she began to attract critical attention.

Comic works
Doucet began being published by Drawn & Quarterly in January 1991 in a regular-sized comic series also named Dirty Plotte.  Shortly thereafter, she moved to New York. Although she moved to Seattle the following year, her experiences in New York formed the basis of the critically acclaimed My New York Diary (many stories of which were taken from Dirty Plotte). She moved from Seattle to Berlin in 1995, before finally returning to Montreal in 1998.  While in Berlin, she had a book named Ciboire de criss published by L'Association in Paris, her first book in French. Once back in Montreal, she released the twelfth and final issue of Dirty Plotte before beginning a brief hiatus from comics.

She returned to the field in 2000 with The Madame Paul Affair, a slice-of-life look at contemporary Montreal which was originally serialized in Ici-Montreal, a local alternative weekly. At the same time, she was branching out into more experimental territory, culminating with the 2001 release of Long Time Relationship, a collection of prints and engravings. In 2004, Doucet also published in French an illustrated diary (Journal) chronicling about a year of her life and, in 2006, an autobiography made from a collage of words cut from magazines and newspapers (J comme Je).  Also in spring of 2006 she had her first solo print show, named en souvenir du Melek, at the galerie B-312 in Montreal. In December 2007, Drawn and Quarterly published 365 Days: A Diary by Julie Doucet, in which she chronicled her life for a year, starting in late 2002.

Post-comic works
She remained a fixture in the Montreal arts community, but in an interview in the June 22, 2006, edition of the Montreal Mirror, she declared that she had retired from long-form comics.

She also said "...it's quite a lot of work, and not that much money. I went to a newspaper to propose a comic strip because I only had to draw a small page and it would be out the next week. For once it was regular pay and good money."

She had a book of poetry published by L'Oie de Cravan in 2006, À l’école de l’amour. Her post-comics artwork consists of linocuts, collage, and papier-mâché sculptures. In 2007, Doucet designed the cover for the Penguin Classics Deluxe Edition of Louisa May Alcott's Little Women.

Return to comics 
In April 2022, Doucet returned to making comics with Time Zone J, published by Drawn and Quarterly. As she said about making the new comic:

Time Zone J is notable for its unusual format, which is designed to be read from the bottom of each page to the top.

Awards and honours
In 1991, Dirty Plotte was nominated for best new series and Doucet won the Harvey Award for "Best New Talent".  In 1999, when The Comics Journal made a list of the top 100 comics of all time, she was on several of the short-lists and Dirty Plotte ranked 96th. In 2000, her book My New York Diary won the Firecracker award for best graphic novel.  Doucet's book 365 Days: A Diary was nominated for best book award at the 2009 Doug Wright Awards. In 2019, Doucet's Dirty Plotte collection was nominated for the SPX Ignatz award for outstanding collection.

In March 2022, she was awarded the Grand Prix de la ville d'Angoulême as a lifetime achievement. She is only the third woman to win the award.

Bibliography
 Dirty Plotte (minicomic) (12 issues, 1988-1989
 Dirty Plotte (12 issues, Drawn and Quarterly, Jan. 1991–Aug. 1998)
 Lift Your Leg, My Fish is Dead! (Drawn and Quarterly, 1993) 
 My Most Secret Desire (Drawn and Quarterly, 1995) 
 My New York Diary (Drawn and Quarterly, May 1999) 
 The Madame Paul Affair (Drawn and Quarterly, 2000)  — also published in French (L'Association) and Spanish (Inrevés Edicions)
 Long Time Relationship (Drawn and Quarterly, 2001) 
 (with Benoît Chaput) Melek (2002)
 Ciboire de criss L'Association, 2004) 
 Journal (L'Association, 2004) 
 J comme Je: Essais d'autobiographie (Seuil French, 2006) 
 Elle Humour (Gingko Press, 2006) 
 Je suis un K (2006)
 365 Days: A Diary by Julie Doucet (Drawn and Quarterly, 2007) 
 À l'école de l'amour (L'Oie de Cravan, 2007) 
  (with Michel Gondry) My New New York Diary (PictureBox, 2010) 
 Dirty Plotte: The Complete Julie Doucet (Drawn and Quarterly, 2018) 
 Time Zone J (Drawn and Quarterly, 2022)

In popular culture 
Doucet’s name appears in the lyrics of the Le Tigre song "Hot Topic."

See also

 List of feminist comic books
 Portrayal of women in comics

References

External links
 
 Tumblr blog
 Store
 Bio page at Lambiek.net
 Julie Doucet webcomic at The Walrus magazine
 Chronological list of Julie Doucet's work at the Grand Comics Database

1965 births
Artists from Montreal
Canadian comics artists
Canadian comics writers
Canadian graphic novelists
Canadian women artists
Canadian women novelists
Canadian female comics artists
Female comics writers
Harvey Award winners for Best New Talent
Living people
Quebec comics
Underground cartoonists
Writers from Montreal
Grand Prix de la ville d'Angoulême winners